A yard of ale or yard glass is a very tall beer glass used for drinking around  of beer, depending upon the diameter.

The glass most likely originated in 17th-century England, where the glass was known also as a "long glass", a "Cambridge yard (glass)" and an "ell glass". It is associated by legend with stagecoach drivers, though was mainly used for drinking feats and special toasts.

Drinking a yard glass full of beer as quickly as possible is a traditional pub game; the bulb at the bottom of the glass makes it likely that the contestant will be splashed with a sudden rush of beer towards the end of the feat. The fastest drinking of a yard of ale in the Guinness Book of Records is 5 seconds.

Description
In countries where the metric system is used, the glass may be . Because the glass is so long and in any case does not usually have a stable flat base, it is hung on the wall when not in use.

History

The glass most likely originated in 17th-century England, where the glass was known also as a "long glass", a "Cambridge yard (glass)" and an "ell glass". Such a glass was a testament to the glassblower's skill as much as the drinker's. John Evelyn records in his Diary the formal yet festive drinking of a yard of ale toast to James II at Bromley in Kent (now southeast London), 1685. 

Yard glasses can be found hanging on the walls of some English pubs, and there are a number of pubs named The Yard of Ale throughout the country.

Usage
Drinking a yard glass full of beer is a traditional pub game in the UK. Some ancient colleges at Oxford University have sconcing forfeits. Former Australian Prime Minister Bob Hawke was previously the world record holder for the fastest drinking of a yard of beer, when he downed a sconce pot in eleven seconds as part of a traditional Oxford college penalty.

In New Zealand, where it is referred to as a "yardie", drinking a yard glass full of beer is traditionally performed at a 21st birthday by the celebrated person.

See also

Beer tower
Drinking horn

References

Drinking glasses
Beer glassware
Drinkware
Alcohol measurement

da:Ebba